Patrick James Dalton (12 June 1942 – 8 January 2020) was an Australian rules footballer who played 217 games for Perth in the WANFL from 1960-71. He was named on the interchange bench in Perth's official "Team of the Century". A regular for Perth during the 1960s, Dalton was almost always used as a centreman. He was a member of three consecutive premiership teams at Perth, in 1966, 1967 and 1968. 

Dalton won the 1970 Sandover Medal, in his second-last league season, and also won two Perth best and fairest awards during his career. He represented the Western Australian state team on one occasion, against Victoria in 1969.

References

Links

Perth Football Club players
Sandover Medal winners
2020 deaths
1942 births
Australian rules footballers from Western Australia